Barbara Bailey Jongbloed (born 1959) is an American state court judge from Connecticut who is a former nominee to be a United States district judge of the United States District Court for the District of Connecticut.

Education 

Jongbloed earned her Bachelor of Arts, cum laude, from Lawrence University and her Juris Doctor from New York University School of Law.

Legal career 

Upon graduation from law school, Jongbloed served as a law clerk to Judge T. F. Gilroy Daly of the United States District Court for the District of Connecticut. She has also served as an Assistant United States Attorney and Chief of the Criminal Division in the United States Attorney's Office for the District of Connecticut.

State court service 

She currently serves as a Judge on the New London District Superior Court for the State of Connecticut.

Expired nomination to district court 

On August 28, 2019, President Trump announced his intent to nominate Jongbloed to serve as a United States district judge for the United States District Court for the District of Connecticut. She has been nominated to the seat vacated by Judge Alvin W. Thompson, who took senior status on August 31, 2018. On October 15, 2019, her nomination was sent to the Senate. That same day, the American Bar Association rated her as "well qualified", its highest recommendation.  On October 30, 2019, a hearing on her nomination was held before the Senate Judiciary Committee. On November 21, 2019, her nomination was reported out of committee by voice vote. On January 3, 2021, her nomination was returned to the President under Rule XXXI, Paragraph 6 of the United States Senate.

References

External links 

1959 births
Living people
20th-century American judges
21st-century American judges
American women lawyers
Assistant United States Attorneys
Connecticut state court judges
Lawrence University alumni
New York University School of Law alumni
People from Washington, D.C.
20th-century American women judges
21st-century American women judges